The next German federal election will be held on or before 26 October 2025 to elect the members of the 21st Bundestag.

Date 
The Basic Law and the Federal Election Act provide that federal elections must be held on a Sunday or on a national holiday no earlier than 46 and no later than 48 months after the first sitting of a Bundestag, unless the Bundestag is dissolved earlier. The 20th and sitting Bundestag held its first sitting on 26 October 2021. Therefore, the next election has to take place on one of the following possible dates:

 31 August 2025 (Sunday)
 7 September 2025 (Sunday)
 14 September 2025 (Sunday)
 21 September 2025 (Sunday)
 28 September 2025 (Sunday)
 3 October 2025 (German Unity Day)
 5 October 2025 (Sunday)
 12 October 2025 (Sunday)
 19 October 2025 (Sunday)
 26 October 2025 (Sunday)

The exact date will be determined by the President of Germany in due course. Federal elections can be held earlier if the President of Germany dissolves the Bundestag and schedules a snap election. They may only do so under two possible scenarios described by the Basic Law.
 If the Bundestag fails to elect a Chancellor with an absolute majority of its members on the 15th day after the first ballot of a Chancellor's election, the President is free to either appoint the candidate who received a plurality of votes as Chancellor or to dissolve the Bundestag (in accordance with Article 63, Section 4 of the Basic Law).
 If the Chancellor loses a confidence motion, they may ask the President to dissolve the Bundestag. The President is free to grant or to deny the Chancellor's request (in accordance with Article 68 of the Basic Law).

In both cases, federal elections would have to take place on a Sunday or national holiday no later than 60 days after the dissolution. Under both scenarios, a snap election is not possible during a state of defence. Federal elections can also be held later, if a state of defence is declared. If a state of defence prohibits a scheduled federal election and prolongs a legislative period, new elections have to take place no later than six months after the end of the state of defence.

Political parties and leaders 

The table below lists the parties represented in the 20th Bundestag.

Opinion polls

Notes

References 

2025
Federal
Germany